New York State Route 126 is an east–west state highway in Jefferson and Lewis Counties in New York, United States, that was established in the late 1970s.

New York State Route 126 may also refer to:
New York State Route 126 (1930–1936) in Westchester County
New York State Route 126 (1940–1972) in Oswego County